Joseph Ganda (born 10 March 1997) is an Israeli professional footballer who plays as a forward for German club SV Sandhausen.

Early life
Ganda was born in Israel to parents from Congo. He grew up in south Tel Aviv with his mother after Ganda's parents got divorced and his father left Israel. He quickly took a liking to football and joined Maccabi Tel Aviv at the age of seven.

Career statistics

Club

References

1997 births
Living people
Israeli footballers
Israel youth international footballers
Maccabi Netanya F.C. players
Hapoel Ironi Kiryat Shmona F.C. players
Hapoel Tel Aviv F.C. players
FC Augsburg II players
FC Admira Wacker Mödling players
SV Sandhausen players
Israeli Premier League players
Regionalliga players
Austrian Football Bundesliga players
Association football forwards
Israeli people of Democratic Republic of the Congo descent
Footballers from Tel Aviv
Israeli expatriate footballers
Expatriate footballers in Austria
Israeli expatriate sportspeople in Austria
Expatriate footballers in Germany
Israeli expatriate sportspeople in Germany